Ante Vukičević (born 24 February 1993) is a Croatian water polo player for CN Marseille and the Croatian national team.

He participated at the 2019 World Championships.

See also
 List of world champions in men's water polo
 List of World Aquatics Championships medalists in water polo

References

External links
 

1993 births
Living people
Croatian expatriate sportspeople in France
Croatian male water polo players
Expatriate water polo players
World Aquatics Championships medalists in water polo
Water polo players at the 2020 Summer Olympics
Olympic water polo players of Croatia